The Clausura 2019 Liga MX championship stage commonly known as Liguilla (mini league) was played from 8 May 2019 to 26 May 2019. A total of eight teams competed in the championship stage to decide the champions of the Clausura 2019 Liga MX season. Both finalists qualified to the 2020 CONCACAF Champions League.

Qualified teams
The following 8 teams qualified for the championship stage.

In the following table, the number of appearances, last appearance, and previous best result count only those in the short tournament era starting from Invierno 1996 (not counting those in the long tournament era from 1943–44 to 1995–96).

Format
Teams were re-seeded each round.
Team with more goals on aggregate after two matches advanced.
Away goals rule was applied in the quarter-finals and semi-finals, but not the final.
In the quarter-finals and semi-finals, if the two teams were tied on aggregate and away goals, the higher seeded team advanced.
In the final, if the two teams were tied after both legs, the match went to extra time and, if necessary, a shoot-out.
Both finalists qualified to the 2020 CONCACAF Champions League.

Bracket

Quarter-finals

|}

First leg

Second leg

2–2 on aggregate. UANL advanced for being the higher seed in the classification table.

León won 5–2 on aggregate.

América won 3–2 on aggregate.

1–1 on aggregate. Monterrey advanced for being the higher seed in the classification table.

Semi-finals

|}

First leg

Second leg

1–1 on aggregate. UANL advanced for being the higher seed in the classification table.

1–1 on aggregate. León advanced for being the higher seed in the classification table.

Finals

|}

First leg

Details

Statistics

Second leg

UANL won 1–0 on aggregate.

Details

Statistics

Statistics

Goalscorers
2 goals
 Gustavo Bou (Tijuana)
 Joel Campbell (León)
 André-Pierre Gignac (UANL)
 José Juan Macías (León)
 Roger Martínez (América)

1 goal
 Javier Aquino (UANL)
 Cristian Calderón (Necaxa)
 Milton Caraglio (Cruz Azul)
 Dorlan Pabón (Monterrey)
 Guido Pizarro (UANL)
 Rodolfo Pizarro (Monterrey)
 Jonathan Rodríguez (Cruz Azul)
 Ángelo Sagal (Pachuca)
 Rubens Sambueza (León)
 Bruno Valdez (América)

1 own goal
 Diego Braghieri (against León)
 Igor Lichnovsky (against América)
 Luis Rodríguez (against Pachuca)

Assists
2 assists
 Rafael Carioca (UANL)
 Andrés Ibargüen (América)
 Ángel Mena (León)

1 assist
 Roberto Alvarado (Cruz Azul)
 Daniel Álvarez (Necaxa)
 Miller Bolaños (Tijuana)
 Edwin Cardona (Pachuca)
 Andrés Ibargüen (América)
 Renato Ibarra (América)
 Miguel Layún (Monterrey)
 Luis Montes (León)
 Ariel Nahuelpán (Tijuana)
 Rubens Sambueza (León)
 William Tesillo (León)
 Eduardo Vargas (UANL)

Notes

References

 
1
Liga MX seasons